Donglan County is a county of northwest Guangxi, China. It is under the administration of Hechi City.

Donglan County has given its name to the Donglan golden-line barbel (Sinocyclocheilus donglanensis), a small fish that is only known from one cave in Donglan.

Administrative divisions 
There are 5 towns, 8 townships and 1 ethnic township in the county:

Towns:
Donglan Town (东兰镇), Aidong (隘洞镇), Changle (长乐镇), Sanshi (三石镇), Wuzhuan (武篆镇)

Townships:
Simeng Township (泗孟乡), Lanmu Township (兰木乡), Changjiang Township (长江乡), Bachou Township (巴畴乡), Jingu Township (金谷乡), Datong Township (大同乡), Huaxiang Township (花香乡), Chuxue Township (切学乡), Sannong Yao Ethnic Township (三弄瑶族乡)

Climate

References

External links 

 
Counties of Guangxi
Administrative divisions of Hechi